The qualification rounds for the 2014 UEFA Women's Under-17 Championship were a series of association football matches between national teams to determine the participants to the European Youth Championship. The first matches were played on 2 July 2013.

All times are CEST (UTC+02:00).

Qualification modus

Qualifying round
The qualifying round was played from 2 July to 11 August 2013. Top seeded teams Germany, Spain and France received a bye to the second round. The draw was made on 20 November 2012.

Tiebreakers
Tie-breakers between teams with the same number of points are:
 Higher number of points obtained in the matches played between the teams in question
 Superior goal difference resulting from the matches played between the teams in question
 Higher number of goals scored in the matches played between the teams in question
If now two teams still are tied, reapply tie-breakers 1–3, if this does not break the tie, go on.
 Superior goal difference in all group matches
 Higher number of goals scored in all group matches
 Drawing of lots

Group 1
Hosted by Scotland.

Group 2
Hosted by Estonia.

Group 3
Hosted by Ukraine.

Group 4
Hosted by Russia.

Group 5
Hosted by Moldova.

Group 6
Hosted by Israel.

Group 7
Hosted by Slovenia.

Group 8
Hosted by Poland.

Group 9
Hosted by Bulgaria.

Group 10
Hosted by Denmark.

Ranking of third-placed teams
To determine the best third-placed team from the qualifying round, only the results against the top two teams in each group were taken into account.

The following criteria are applied to determine the rankings:
higher number of points obtained in these matches
superior goal difference from these matches
higher number of goals scored in these matches
fair play conduct of the teams in all group matches in the qualifying round
drawing of lots

Elite round
21 teams from the qualifying round are joined by Germany, Spain and France to make it a total of 24 teams. The round consists of six groups with four teams in each group. Group winners and the best second-placed team advance to the final tournament in England. The draw was held on 15 August 2013.

Tiebreakers
Tie-breakers between teams with the same number of points are:
 Higher number of points obtained in the matches played between the teams in question
 Superior goal difference resulting from the matches played between the teams in question
 Higher number of goals scored in the matches played between the teams in question
If now two teams still are tied, reapply tie-breakers 1–3, if this does not break the tie, go on.
 Superior goal difference in all group matches
 Higher number of goals scored in all group matches
 Drawing of lots

Group 1
Hosted by Romania.

Group 2
Hosted by Austria.

Group 3
Hosted by Portugal.

Group 4
Hosted by Northern Ireland.

Group 5
Hosted by Hungary.

Group 6
Hosted by Germany.

Ranking of second-placed teams
To determine the best runners-up from the elite round, only the results against the top two teams in each group were taken into account.

The following criteria are applied to determine the rankings:
higher number of points obtained in these matches
superior goal difference from these matches
higher number of goals scored in these matches
fair play conduct of the teams in all group matches in the elite round
drawing of lots

References

External links
UEFA.com

Qualification
Women's Under-17 Championship qualification
2013 in women's association football
2014
2013 in youth sport